Better Hope  is a village located in the Demerara-Mahaica region of Guyana. The village has been named after the Plantation Betterhoop It was originally a fishing village with many working on the sugar estates and nearby farms. The majority of the population is Indo-Guyanese with a minority of Afro-Guyanese.

In 2018, a road was named in honor of Moses Dwarka, a competitive marathoner born in the town. Moses represented British Guiana in the 1959 Pan American Games.

References

Populated places in Demerara-Mahaica